The 1946 Western New York Little Three Conference football season was the season of college football played by the three member schools of the Western New York Little Three Conference (Little Three) as part of the 1946 college football season. 

The St. Bonaventure Bonnies won the Little Three championship with a 6–2 record and outscored opponents by a total of 179 to 69.

Conference overview

Teams

St. Bonaventure

The 1946 St. Bonaventure Bonnies football team, sometimes referred to as the St. Bonaventure Brown Indians, represented St. Bonaventure University. The team compiled a 6–1 record in the regular season, lost to Muhlenberg in the inaugural Tobacco Bowl, and outscored all opponents by a total of 179 to 69. The 1946 season marked St. Bonaventure's return to intercollegiate football after a three-year hiatus during World War II.

The team was led by first-year head coach Hugh Devore. Devore led the 1945 Notre Dame Fighting Irish football team to a 7–2–1 record before moving on to St. Bonaventure.

The team played its home games at the newly-constructed Forness Stadium in Olean, New York. The dedication of the new stadium was held on September 28 during a game against Youngstown.

Two St. Bonaventure players were selected in the 1947 NFL Draft held on December 16, 1946. They were back Hugo Marcolini (16th round, 137th pick, by the Boston Yanks) and Steve Cipot (23rd round, 206th pick, by the Detroit Lions).

Canisius

The 1946 Canisius Golden Griffins football team represented Canisius College in Buffalo, New York. In their first year under head coach Earl Brown, the Golden Griffins compiled a 4–3–1 record, finished in second place in the Little Three, and outscored opponents by a total of 148 to 58.

Niagara

The 1946 Niagara Purple Eagles football team represented Niagara University in Lewiston in Niagara County, New York. In their first year under head coach James Moran Sr., the Purple Eagles compiled a 6–2 record, finished in third place in the Little Three, and outscored opponents by a total of 151 to 55.

References